Brett Leonhardt (born September 21, 1982) is a former ice hockey goaltender for the Kitchener Dutchmen of the Greater Ontario Junior Hockey League (GOJHL), the State University of New York at Oswego of the State University of New York Athletic Conference (SUNYAC), and Neumann College of ECAC West. He is currently an assistant coach with the Washington Capitals of the National Hockey League (NHL). He suited up twice as an emergency backup goaltender (EBUG) for the Washington Capitals, on December 12, 2008, and November 29, 2013.

Career
Leonhardt was a web producer with the Capitals from the fall of 2007 until February 2011, when he left for a video editing job with the NHL in Toronto. He returned to the Capitals in 2012 as their video coach. 

As a coach, he won the Stanley Cup with the Washington Capitals in 2018. Leonhardt was promoted to Assistant Coach-Video starting the Washington Capitals 2018–19 season.

Washington call-ups
On December 12, 2008, the Capitals were preparing to host the Ottawa Senators. During the morning skate, starting goaltender José Théodore suffered a hip flexor injury, forcing the Capitals to recall Semyon Varlamov from their American Hockey League (AHL) affiliate, the Hershey Bears so that he could back up goaltender Brent Johnson. However, Varlamov was with the Bears in San Antonio, Texas and was unable to make it to Washington in time to start the game as the backup goaltender. As a result, the Capitals were forced to dress three goaltenders, signing Leonhardt, the team's web producer, to an amateur tryout contract before the game to back up Brent Johnson until the arrival of Varlamov. Because of his experience in NCAA Division III ice hockey with the State University of New York at Oswego and Neumann College, as well as the Kitchener Dutchmen of the GOJHL, Leonhardt, nicknamed "Stretch" due to his height, had previously participated in on-ice practice sessions with the Capitals, filling in when an additional goaltender was needed. Varlamov arrived 9:03 into the first period and replaced Leonhardt as Johnson's backup for the remainder of the game. He did not receive any pay for his contract. These bizarre circumstances were remarkably similar to those the Vancouver Canucks faced on December 9, 2003, when starting goaltender Dan Cloutier suffered a groin injury during the morning skate, forcing the Canucks to sign University of British Columbia goaltender Chris Levesque to an amateur tryout contract.

On November 29, 2013, Capitals starting goalie Michal Neuvirth was injured during warmups before a game against the Montreal Canadiens and scratched from the lineup. Braden Holtby filled in as the starter and with no time to call anyone up from the minors, Leonhardt served as emergency backup goalie. Leonhardt still performed his duties as video coach during the second intermission wearing full goalie gear.

Career statistics

References

External links
Official Washington Capitals profile

1982 births
Canadian ice hockey goaltenders
Ice hockey people from Ontario
Sportspeople from Kitchener, Ontario
Living people
Neumann Knights men's ice hockey players
Oswego Lakers men's ice hockey players
Washington Capitals coaches
Canadian ice hockey coaches
Stanley Cup champions